Belowars is a 2009 Brazilian animated film directed by Paulo Munhoz based on the book Guerra Dentro da Gente, by Paulo Leminski.

Plot
The film follows the story of Baita, a boy who meets an old man, Kutala, who offers to start it in the art of war. Seduced by that idea, Baita starts a journey of adventure and inner transformation.

Cast
Chico Nogueira as Kutala
André Coelho as Baita
Célia Ribeira as Princess
Mauro Zanata as Seller
Regina Vogue as Gorda
Enéas Lour as Captain Baluta

References

2009 films
Brazilian animated films
Films based on Brazilian novels
2000s Portuguese-language films